Immunotransplant is a maneuver used to make vaccines more powerful.  It refers to the process of infusing vaccine-primed T lymphocytes into lymphodepleted recipients for the purpose of enhancing the proliferation and function of those T cells and increasing immune protection induced by that vaccine.

The concept takes advantage of data from animal and studies in vaccinology and the homeostasis of T cells and has applications in the treatment of infectious disease, immunodeficiency syndromes, and cancer.

Basic Immunology

Vaccines
Historically, the effect of vaccines -particularly against pathogens- has been assessed by measurement of their induction of a B-cell-mediated -or humoral- immune response, i.e. the production of pathogen-specific antibodies.  In the study of both infectious diseases and cancer, a majority of potential immune targets are only expressed intra-cellularly, and are thus inaccessible to antibody-mediated elimination.  T-cell mediated immunity, by contrast, has the potential to recognize targets expressed either extra- or intra-cellularly and has therefore been studied extensively for treatment of these diseases.

A number of pre-clinical and clinical studies have demonstrated that vaccines against pathogens, bystander (non-pathogenic) proteins, tumor-associated antigens, or whole tumor cells, can induce specific T-cell mediated immune responses.  A number of approaches have been considered to amplify T cell mediated immune responses(e.g. IL-2, CTLA-4, IL-7, CD137), and some of these have shown clinical efficacy in eliminating particular types of cancer, most notably melanoma and renal cell carcinoma.

T-Cell Homeostasis and Homeostatic Proliferation
The use of immunotransplant to enhance T cell-mediated immune responses, derive from studies of T cell homeostasis.  The total cohort of T cells in an organism maintain homeostasis – a consistent total number of T cells in the peripheral blood.  Transient elevations in peripheral blood T cell counts cause the whole population to diminish, transient depletions cause the whole population to proliferate, generally maintaining a roughly total T cell count.  The latter situation –lymphodepletion– has been studied extensively and the proliferation of mature T cells upon transfer into the lymphopenic host is referred to as “lymphodepletion-induced” or “homeostatic” proliferation.  It has been shown that homeostatic proliferation induces not only quantitative changes in T cell cohorts, but qualitative changes as well, such as increased function and the development of a memory-cell phenotype.  The mechanism of these changes has been shown to be primarily due to upregulation of a group of cytokines including IL-7 and IL-15 induced by lymphodepletion.  Additionally, lymphodepletion is a non-selective method of eliminating several known regulatory, or immunosuppressive, subsets of immune cells, such as regulatory T cells.

Clinical Trials Of T-Cell Adoptive Transfer
These observations have prompted several clinical studies of infusing pathogen- or tumor-specific T cells into lymphodepleted patients.  A group at the National Cancer Institute demonstrated remarkable efficacy by infusing melanoma-specific T cells (obtained by growing tumor-infiltrating T cells ex vivo) into melanoma patients treated with lymphodepleting chemotherapy.  In a series of studies (to 2005) of this approach, up to 70% of treated patients were shown to have regressions of their tumors, many of which had been considerable in size and refractory to other therapies.  These findings compare favorably with standard-of-care therapies for melanoma which generally lead to tumor regressions in only ~10-12% of patients.

Pre-Clinical Studies And Clinical Trials Of Vaccine-Primed T-Cell Adoptive Transfer (I.E. Immunotransplant)
Because of the logistic difficulty of obtaining tumor-specific T cells via the ex vivo expansion of tumor-infiltrating cells, a number of studies have examined inducing these cells in vivo by vaccination.   Levitsky et al., at Johns Hopkins, in a series of pre-clinical studies demonstrated that vaccine-induced T cells could be considerably more effective when re-infused into lymphodepleted recipients.  Subsequently, a clinical study in patients with multiple myeloma conducted by June et al., demonstrated that a standard vaccination against pneumonia could induce a T-cell-mediated response to the vaccine and that re-infusing these T cells after an extremely lymphodepletive therapy –autologous stem cell transplant – could significantly enhance that response.

To expand this immunotransplant concept to the amplification of anti-cancer immunity, researchers at Stanford University developed a pre-clinical lymphoma model using a in situ, CpG-base vaccine to induce anti-tumor immunity and demonstrated that this immunity was enhanced 10-40 fold by immunotransplant.  The above studies by Levitsky et al., were an important precedent for this work.  In fact the Hopkins published preliminary results of a clinical study testing the basic immunotransplant concept in acute myeloid leukemia  demonstrating encouraging signals of enhanced anti-tumor immunity.  To continue the clinical translation of this approach, in August 2009 the Stanford group initiated a phase I/II clinical trial for patients with newly diagnosed mantle cell lymphoma.  That study uses a whole-cell, CpG-activated, autologous tumor vaccine to induce anti-tumor immunity followed by leukapheresis and re-infusion of the vaccine-primed cells immediately after standard autologous transplant.  Initial results of this study were presented at the ASCO 2011 Annual Meeting showing successful data towards the primary endpoint: amplification of anti-tumor T-cell responses.

See also
Vaccine
Immunology
T-Cell
CpG

References

Immunology